Ricardo Alegre Bojórquez (born 4 March 1959) is a Mexican politician affiliated with the National Action Party. As of 2014 he served as Deputy of the LIX Legislature of the Mexican Congress representing Querétaro.

References

1959 births
Living people
Politicians from Veracruz
National Action Party (Mexico) politicians
Politicians from Querétaro
21st-century Mexican politicians
Deputies of the LIX Legislature of Mexico
Members of the Chamber of Deputies (Mexico) for Querétaro